Oneida is a census-designated place (CDP) in Schuylkill County, Pennsylvania. The population was 219 at the 2000 census.

Geography

Demographics

At the 2000 census, there were 219 people, 112 households, and 57 families living in the CDP. The population density was 1,205.6 people per square mile (469.8/km). There were 135 housing units at an average density of 743.2/sq mi (289.6/km).  The racial makeup of the CDP was 100.00% White.
Of the 112 households 16.1% had children under the age of 18 living with them, 38.4% were married couples living together, 7.1% had a female householder with no husband present, and 49.1% were non-families. 42.9% of households were one person and 25.9% were one person aged 65 or older. The average household size was 1.96 and the average family size was 2.70.

The age distribution was 14.2% under the age of 18, 7.3% from 18 to 24, 26.0% from 25 to 44, 21.9% from 45 to 64, and 30.6% 65 or older. The median age was 49 years. For every 100 females, there were 90.4 males. For every 100 females age 18 and over, there were 82.5 males.

The median household income was $25,250 and the median family income  was $28,250. Males had a median income of $27,917 versus $20,250 for females. The per capita income for the CDP was $18,756. About 3.8% of families and 2.2% of the population were below the poverty line, including none of those under the age of eighteen and 6.5% of those sixty five or over.

Notable person
Jim Honochick, former Major League Baseball umpire

References

Census-designated places in Pennsylvania
Census-designated places in Schuylkill County, Pennsylvania